= Libum, Bithynia =

Town of ancient Bithynia

Coordinates: 40°37′54″N 29°41′10″E

Libum or Libon was a town of ancient Bithynia, on the road from Nicomedia to Nicaea.

Its site is located near Senaiye, in Asiatic Turkey.
